Mark Carter is a former rugby football player. He represented Auckland in both rugby union and rugby league and represented New Zealand in rugby union. He has a street named after him in South Auckland.

Early life

Carter attended Liston College in Henderson, West Auckland.

Rugby Union
He played in the 1991 Rugby World Cup. He is the only forward in the Auckland Blues to have scored three tries in a Super 12 match, which he did in 1998 while playing the Stormers.

References

External links
Mark Carter @ '''Rugby League Project

1968 births
Living people
Auckland rugby union players
New Zealand rugby union players
New Zealand international rugby union players
New Zealand rugby league players
New Zealand Warriors players
People educated at Liston College
Rugby league players from Auckland
Rugby league second-rows
Rugby union players from Auckland